Rumi Urqu (Quechua rumi stone, urqu mountain, "stone mountain", Hispanicized spelling Rumi Orjo) is a mountain in the Wansu mountain range in the Andes of Peru, about  high. It is situated in the Arequipa Region, La Unión Province, Puyca District. Rumi Urqu lies at the bank of the Qumpi P'allqa River (Compepalca). Yuraq Rumi is to the northeast, beyond the river.

References 

Mountains of Arequipa Region